High Court of Justice is the name of several courts:

 In the United Kingdom:
 High Court of Justice (England and Wales)
 High Court of Justice in Northern Ireland
 High Court of Justice for the trial of Charles I
 In Ireland:
 High Court of Justice in Ireland, a historic court in Ireland
 High Court (Ireland), formerly known as the "High Court of Justice of Ireland"
Others
 High Court of Justice (France)
 High Court of Justice (Cameroon)
 High Court of Justice in Rivers State, Nigeria
 High Court of Justice (Israel)
 Court of First Instance of the High Court of Hong Kong, formerly the High Court of Justice of the Supreme Court of Hong Kong

See also
 High court
 Superior court
 Supreme court
 High Court of Parliament (disambiguation)